Hikichi (written: 曳地 or 挽地 or 引地) is a Japanese surname. Notable people with the surname include:

, Japanese footballer
, Japanese footballer

See also
Hikiji (disambiguation)

Japanese-language surnames